Mousouroi is a former municipality in the Chania regional unit, Crete, Greece. Since the 2011 local government reform it is part of the municipality Platanias, of which it is a municipal unit. It was part of the former Kydonia Province. The municipal unit extends from the hinterland of the town of Chania to the mountains of south Crete. Many tourists pass through Mousouroi on their way to Omalos and the start of the Samaria Gorge walk, which is in Mousouroi. Mousouroi is bordered by Voukolies in the southwest, Platanias in the northwest, Theriso to the east and East Selino in the southwest with Sfakia in the southeast.

The municipal unit includes;
Alikianos: Population 825, Area: 5,302 km2. The administrative centre, in the northeast 
Koufos: Population: 149, Area: 3,369 km2. Just north of Alikianos 
Psathogiannos: Population: 159, Area: 3,599 km2. Northwest.
Fournes: Population: 576, Area: 9,804 km2. South of Alikianos, on the road to Omalos. 
Skines: Population: 621, Area: 8,228 km2. South of Alikianos, on the road to Sougia. 
Sebronas (Sempronas, Σέμπρωνας): Population: 92, Area: 14,331 km2. West of the Sougia road, south of Prases
Prases: Population: 138, Area: 27,511 km2. South of Alikianos on the Sougia road, before the Omalos turn off
Orthouni: Population: 94, Area: 20,634 km2. South of Alikianos between the Omalos and Sougia roads
Meskla: Population: 353, Area: 22,435 km2. Eastern Mousouroi, southeast of Alikianos, northeast of Omalos, east of the Omalos road   
Lakkoi: Population: 270, Area: 55,573 km2. South of Alikianos on the road to Omalos, south of Fournes  
Karanos (Καράνος): Population: 88, Area: 5,777 km2. South of Alikianos between Skines and Lakki, north of the Omalos road on a windy mountainous road joining the latter to the Sougia road    
Vatolakos: Population: 661, Area: 15,181 km2. West of Alikianos, on the road to Skonizo

See also
List of communities of Chania

References

External links
Municipality description
GTP description
Municipalities of Chania: Mousouron

Populated places in Chania (regional unit)